Aliaksandra Viktarauna Herasimenia (born 31 December 1985) is a Belarusian former swimmer.

After a medal-winning career, including gold at the 2012 World Championships and silver at the 2012 London Olympics, she became a critic of the Lukashenko regime in Belarus, and now lives in exile in Poland.

Swimming career

She is 2 times olympic runner-up (2012 London) in the 50-meter freestyle and 100-meter freestyle, Olympic bronze medalist (2016 Rio de Janeiro) in the 50-meter freestyle, World Champion (2011 Shanghai) in the 100-meter freestyle, World Champion (25m pool) (2012 Istanbul) in the 50-meter freestyle, European Champion (2010 Budapest) in the 50-meter backstroke, and 3 consecutive times Universiade Champion (2009 Belgrade, 2011 Shenzhen and 2013 Kazan) in the 50-meter freestyle.

Despite a two-year ban for a positive test for norandrosterone in 2003, Herasimenia returned to win gold medals at both the European and World Championships.

At the 2011 World Aquatics Championships, she won the gold medal in the 100-meter freestyle, tied with Jeanette Ottesen of Denmark in a time of 53.45.

At the 2012 Summer Olympics, she won silver medals in the 50 and 100-meter freestyle events.

Belarusian political activity
During the 2020 Belarusian protests, Herasimenia was responsible for youth and sports in National Anti-crisis Management, a shadow government created by the Belarusian Coordination Council for the peaceful transfer of power following the 2020 Belarusian presidential election.

Herasimenia is a founder of the Belarusian Sport Solidarity Foundation (BSSF), a group that supports athletes jailed or sidelined for their political views. In April 2021, she sold her 2012 world championship gold medal to raise funds for the foundation and for legal fees after facing charges from the Belarus Government for criticising them on social media.

She was one of the supporters of Belarusian sprinter Krystsina Tsimanouskaya, who was threatened with enforced return to Belarus from the Tokyo Olympics after criticising team coaches. Herasimenia sought assistance for Tsimanouskaya from a number of European embassies.

In March 2022 Herasimenia stated her opposition to the Belarusian government’s involvement in the 2022 Russian invasion of Ukraine: “Ukraine has never been our enemy, it is our fraternal people."

On 26 December 2022, Herasimenia was sentenced in absentia by the Minsk City Court to 12 years in prison.

See also
Swimming at the 2009 World Aquatics Championships
2010 European Aquatics Championships
Swimming at the 2011 World Aquatics Championships
Swimming at the 2012 Summer Olympics
Swimming at the 2016 Summer Olympics

Notes

References

External links
 

1985 births
Living people
Belarusian female butterfly swimmers
Swimmers at the 2008 Summer Olympics
Swimmers at the 2012 Summer Olympics
Swimmers at the 2016 Summer Olympics
Olympic swimmers of Belarus
World Aquatics Championships medalists in swimming
Belarusian female backstroke swimmers
Belarusian female freestyle swimmers
Olympic bronze medalists in swimming
Olympic silver medalists for Belarus
Medalists at the FINA World Swimming Championships (25 m)
European Aquatics Championships medalists in swimming
Medalists at the 2012 Summer Olympics
Olympic bronze medalists for Belarus
Medalists at the 2016 Summer Olympics
Olympic silver medalists in swimming
Universiade medalists in swimming
Sportspeople from Minsk
Universiade gold medalists for Belarus
Universiade silver medalists for Belarus
Universiade bronze medalists for Belarus
Competitors at the 2009 Summer Universiade
Competitors at the 2011 Summer Universiade
Competitors at the 2013 Summer Universiade
Medalists at the 2007 Summer Universiade
People convicted in absentia